Jain Heritage School, (JHS), India, is a co-educational, day boarding school with a day care centre, started by (The JGI Group). The school is located in Hebbal, on the Bangalore - Hyderabad National Highway (NH 7) behind Columbia Asia Hospital Bangalore.

Curriculum
Jain Heritage School offers Central Board of Secondary Education, New Delhi from Grade I - Grade XII and Cambridge International Examinations CIE which includes International General Certificate of Secondary Education IGCSE curriculum from Grade VII-Grade IX.

References

External links
 

Educational institutions established in 2006
High schools and secondary schools in Bangalore
Cambridge schools in India
2006 establishments in Karnataka